The Broadspeed GT 2+2 is a Mini-based fastback-styled motor vehicle designed by Tony Bloor, Broadspeed's sales manager. It was introduced into the UK market in 1966 and continued in production until 1968, when Broadspeed's factory in Birmingham was scheduled for demolition to make way for a new ring road. By then 28 cars had been built, 16 of them reportedly exported to Spain.

Broadspeed had become well known in the early 1960s for its successful BMC Mini racing team, and for producing a variety of road and race-tuning packages for BMC engines. The GT was the company's first and only foray into car manufacturing.

Construction
Cars and Car Conversions magazine characterised the car as "more the ultimate in conversion than a complete new car" after their test drive.

The interior was upgraded by the installation of a replacement fascia with additional auxiliary gauges and Restall bucket seats in the front. The new rear seat was designed to fold down to allow access to the boot, as there was no boot lid in the new rear end.

Autocar magazine described the end product of the conversion as "masquerading as a sort of scaled down DB6 Aston Martin".

Engine and performance
The Broadspeed GT was offered in four versions, with the lightweight GTS being top of the range. There was a choice of three engines: ,  Mini Cooper engine and  Mini Cooper S engine. Prices ranged from £799 for the basic 848 cc engined car to £1,500 for the 1275 cc version, .

References

Notes

Citations

Bibliography

Cars introduced in 1966